LB IV Life is the third studio album by the hip hop group Lost Boyz, released in 1999. Member Freaky Tah was murdered six months before the album was released, but makes multiple appearances on LB IV Life. The album fell short commercially and critically, failing to reach Gold status, and failing to produce any hits. Lead MC Mr. Cheeks pursued a solo career after the release.

The album was recorded and mixed by Bruce Miller at Quad Recording and Soundtracks.

Critical reception
Vibe praised the album's "sonic diversity," writing that Lost Boyz "successfully continue the club-rocking tradition" of previous albums.

Track listing

Samples
Ghetto Jiggy
"Old San Juan" by MFSB
Only Live Once
"Whatever's Fair" by Jerry Butler
Plug Me In
"Window Raisin' Granny" by Gladys Knight & the Pips
Ghetto Lifestyle
"When I'm Gone" by The Jones Girls

Charts

References

1999 albums
Lost Boyz albums